"Tú Me Vuelves Loco" is the second single of the album En Total Plenitud. The song was written and performed by Mexican singer-songwriter Marco Antonio Solís. The song won a Latin Grammy Award for Best Regional Mexican Song at the Latin Grammy Awards of 2011.

Chart performance

References 

2010 singles
Songs written by Marco Antonio Solís
Marco Antonio Solís songs
Fonovisa Records singles
Latin Grammy Award for Best Regional Mexican Song
2010 songs